Datroniella is a genus of poroid crust fungi in the family Polyporaceae. It was circumscribed in 2014 by Chinese mycologists as a segregate genus from Datronia. Datroniella differs from Datronia by their moderately to frequently branched skeletal hyphae in the context, and absence of dendrohyphidia (modified terminal hyphae in the hymenium). The type species of Datroniella is D. scutellata, a fungus originally described as Polyporus scutellatus by Lewis David de Schweinitz. Datroniella fungi cause a white rot, usually on angiosperm wood.

Species
Datroniella melanocarpa B.K.Cui, Hai J.Li & Y.C.Dai (2014) – China
Datroniella minuta Lira & Ryvarden (2016) – Brazil
Datroniella scutellata (Schwein.) B.K.Cui, Hai J.Li & Y.C.Dai (2014)
Datroniella subtropica B.K.Cui, Hai J.Li & Y.C.Dai (2014) – China
Datroniella tibetica B.K.Cui, Hai J.Li & Y.C.Dai (2014) – China
Datroniella tropica B.K.Cui, Hai J.Li & Y.C.Dai (2014) – China

References

Polyporaceae
Polyporales genera
Taxa described in 2014
Taxa named by Yu-Cheng Dai
Taxa named by Bao-Kai Cui